Hervé Phélippeau (born 16 September 1962 in Lorient) is a retired French middle-distance runner who competed primarily in the 1500 metres. He won the gold medal at the 1989 European Indoor Championships. In addition, he represented his country at two World Indoor Championships.

International competitions

Personal bests
Outdoor
800 metres – 1:47.03 (Viareggio 1989)
1000 metres – 2:19.4 (Vannes 1989)
1500 metres – 3:33.54 (Bologna 1990)
One mile – 3:52.57 (Berlin 1989)
3000 metres – 7:53.5 (Lorient 1990)
Indoor
1000 metres – 2:20.31 (Liévin 1993)
1500 metres – 3:36.98 (Seville 1990)

References

All-Athletics profile

1962 births
Living people
Sportspeople from Lorient
French male middle-distance runners
Athletes (track and field) at the 1987 Mediterranean Games
Mediterranean Games competitors for France